Badrul Alam is former Squadron Leader of Bangladesh Air Force and heroic freedom fighter of the Bangladesh War of Independence. For his bravery in the war of independence, the government of Bangladesh awarded him Bir Uttam award, the second highest award for individual gallantry in Bangladesh.  In 2016, he received the Independence Day Award.

Early life 
Though Badrul Alam's ancestral home in Char Barai in Singair upazila of Manikganj, he grew up in Dhaka. He is the son of Khandaker Mohammad Badruddoza and his mother Hosne Ara Begum. His is married to Nadera Alam. They are having one son and one daughter.

Career 
Badrul Alam started his career as a Flying officer in the Pakistan Air Force. Until mid-February 1971, he was posted at Sargodha Airbase in Pakistan. At this time he was posted to Dhaka. When the war of liberation started, he fled from Dhaka to India in the first half of May. At first he worked as a staff officer at the Mukti Bahini headquarters. He later joined the Bangladesh Air Force when it was formed. He was instrumental in recruiting and training the pilots and airmen needed for the Air Force.He Started direct operation from November, 1971. Apart from Godnail, he conducted air operations in several other places including Akhaura, Sylhet and Raipura in Narsingdi. Most of these air strikes were carried out under his command. Badrul Alam served in the Bangladesh Air Force until 1975. After retirement form BAF, he worked in Bangladesh Biman.

Contribution to the liberation war of Bangladesh 
On December 3, 1971, Badrul Alam flew an alouette helicopter armed with 14 rockets and machine gun from Dimapur, a hilly area in the Indian state of Nagaland to strike and destroy fuel depot of Pakistan Army situated near Godnail, Narayanganj. Badrul Alam  was one of three co-pilots along with Sultan Mahmud and Sahabuddin Ahmed. They were accompanied by two operators. Godnail depot supplied fuel for Pakistani ground, naval and air vehicles. In preparation for an all-out war with India, the Pakistanis stockpiled huge quantities of fuel oil. The guerrillas of the Mukti Bahini tried hard but failed to damage the depot due to heavy security. He and his team was successful to destroy that oil depot.

References 

Living people
Recipients of the Independence Day Award
Year of birth missing (living people)
Mukti Bahini personnel
Recipients of the Bir Uttom